Broken Frames is the third studio album by American rock band Eyes Set to Kill. The album was released on June 8, 2010 by Break Silence Records. The album consists of 12 songs and DVD of their interviews and music videos from Reach to Deadly Weapons. It is the only album to feature unclean vocalist Justin Denson, who only remained in the band throughout the duration of 2010 before departing.

The album was announced after the release of the lead single, "All You Ever Knew," released on April 1, 2010. Title-track "Broken Frames" was released as the follow-up second single accompanied with a music video. "Let Me In" was released as Lexia's first single under her solo album, Underground Sounds.

The album is Eyes Set to Kill's highest debut to date in the Independent Albums, and the first to enter Top Hard Rock Albums. The album was ranked fifth of "Locals Only: The Best Albums and EPs in 2010."

Track listing

Singles 
"All You Ever Knew" was released April 1, 2010 as the lead single prior of the album. No music video was filmed.
"Broken Frames", the title track, was released July 2010 as the second single with a music video premiered on July 29, 2010.

Critical reception 

Sputnikmusic states "Once again, Eyes Set To Kill recycle and refine themselves into something every label lusts for, emphasizing confidence and consistency over innovation." The 411: Eyes Set To Kill’s latest record is by far their best written and produced, but it still lacks some of the truly amazing songs to make them a glowing example of the genre. Pernell Fowler of Bring on the Mixed Reviews states "And even with the speed bump that is their current screaming vocalist and sounding very familiar to already cemented bands, ala A Skylit Drive, Blessthefall, and LoveHateHero, Eyes Set To Kill has a few unabated tracks that sound too powerful/beautiful to be ignored." Chris Colgan of PopMatters said "Broken Frames isn’t mind-blowing, but it’s a solid album."

Josh Velliquette of The NewReview states "Broken Frames is an album tugged between two styles – competent, yet harmless post-hardcore and superb, ear-catching rock." Jake Oliver of Decoy Music states "Broken Frames is torn between two worlds, and it is desperately seeking some sort of resolution, making it feel frustratingly incomplete."

Chart performance 
On July 26, 2010, the album debuted at #8 in Top Heatseekers, at #35 in Independent Albums, and at #21 in Top Hard Rock Albums.

Charts

Credits 

Band
 Justin Denson - unclean vocals, keyboards, synthesizers, programming, clean vocals tracks 8 & 9
 Alexia Rodriguez - clean vocals, lead guitar, acoustic guitar, piano
 Greg Kerwin - rhythm guitar
 Anissa Rodriguez - bass
 Caleb Clifton - drums, percussion, samples

 Additional musicians
 Andrew Wade - vocals
 Tom Breyfogle	 - programming
 Jakub Andrew - programming

Production
 Kevin Zinger - producer
 Brad X -  producer
 Dave Aguilera	- producer, management
 Tom Baker - mastering
 Sarah Ellis - stylist
 Jefferson Fernandez - art direction
 Thomas Flowers - engineer, mixing, producer
 Breanna Little - hair stylist, make up
 Casey Quintal	- design
 Nathaniel Taylor - photography
 Andrew Wade - engineer, mixing, producer

References 

2010 albums
Albums produced by Andrew Wade
Eyes Set to Kill albums